Carahue is a city and commune in southern Chile. It is located 56 km west of Temuco, on the northern bank of the Imperial River.

The city was founded as La Imperial on April 16, 1552 by Pedro de Valdivia.
La Imperial or Antigua [Old] Imperial, was abandoned and destroyed as a result of the Mapuche Uprising of 1598 during the War of Arauco in 1600, and refounded in 1882, in course of Occupation of the Araucania, under the name Carahue.

Demographics
Of these, 11,596 (45.1%) lived in urban areas and 14,100 (54.9%) in rural areas. The population grew by 0.8% (196 persons) between the 1992 and 2002 censuses.

Administration
As a commune, Carahue is a third-level administrative division of Chile administered by a municipal council, headed by an alcalde who is directly elected every four years. The 2008-2012 alcalde is Héctor Figueroa Ramírez (UDI).

Within the electoral divisions of Chile, Carahue is represented in the Chamber of Deputies by José Manuel Edwards (RN) and Joaquín Tuma (PDC) as part of the 51st electoral district, (together with Nueva Imperial, Saavedra, Teodoro Schmidt, Freire, Pitrufquén and Cholchol). The commune is represented in the Senate by José Garcia Ruminot (RN) and Eugenio Tuma Zedan (PPD) as part of the 15th senatorial constituency (Araucanía-South).

References

External links

 Municipality of Carahue

Communes of Chile
Populated places in Cautín Province
1552 establishments in the Spanish Empire
Destroyed cities
Mapuche language